Wumenqiao Subdistrict is a subdistrict in Gusu District, Suzhou, Jiangsu, China.

History 
On March 24, 2017, Youxin Subdistrict was merged into Wumenqiao Subdistrict.

Administrative divisions 
The subdistrict administers the following 29 residential communities:

 Youlian First Community
 Youlian Second Community
 Youlian Third Community
 Fuxing Community
 Xinkang Community
 Meiting Community
 Guxiang Community
 Xiangya Community
 Sijijinghua Community
 Xincheng Community
 Youlian Community
 Xinguo Community
 Shuangqiao Community
 Fuyun Community
 Nanhuan First Community
 Nanhuan Second Community
 Nanhuan Third Community
 Meichang Community
 Neima Road Community
 Xinglongqiao Community
 Panxi First Community
 Panxi Second Community
 Jiefang Community
 Jintang Community
 Hejiata Community
 Runda Community
 Longgangyuan Community
 Dalong Community
 Nanhua Community

See also
List of township-level divisions of Suzhou
Youxin Subdistrict

References

Township-level divisions of Suzhou
Gusu District